The 2009 Princeton Tigers football team was an American football team that represented Princeton University during the 2009 NCAA Division I FCS football season. Princeton tied for fourth in the Ivy League.

In their tenth and final year under head coach Roger Hughes, the Tigers compiled a 4–6 record and were outscored 265 to 129. Scott Britton, Wilson Cates, Jordan Culbreath and Mark Paski were the team captains.

Princeton's 3–4 conference record tied with Dartmouth for fourth in the Ivy League standings. Princeton averaged 8,178 fans per game.The Tigers were outscored 192 to 91 by Ivy opponents. 

The Tigers played their home games at Powers Field at Princeton Stadium, on the university campus in Princeton, New Jersey.

Schedule

References

Princeton
Princeton Tigers football seasons
Princeton Tigers football